Eslanda is a given name. Notable people with the name include:

 Eslanda Goode Robeson (1895–1965), American anthropologist, author, actor, and civil rights activist
 Lady Eslanda, fictional character in The Ickabog

Feminine given names